Barbara Friers Olschner (born March 29, 1951) is a published author, speaker, lawyer and politician. Olshner ran for Congress as a moderate Republican in Florida's 2nd congressional district in 2010. In 2013, she published a book titled, The Reluctant Republican: My Fight for the Moderate Majority, released by the University Press of Florida, which is a non-fiction account of the 2010 race. The book received a lot of praise from the general public on her attempt to address extremism. She was also the founder and owner of the law firm Olschner & Hart in Birmingham, Alabama, and now practices law in Fairhope, Alabama. Olschner has over twenty-five years of litigation experience.

She is also the founder of the non-profit organization, Purple Moderates, which was established to "educate, inform and support" a moderate platform in politics.

Early life
Olschner is a native of North Carolina who moved to Birmingham, Alabama, to practice law. After 30 years, she moved to Walton County, Florida, where she currently resides. She holds a Bachelor's degree in Creative Arts from the University of North Carolina and received her law degree from Cumberland School of Law, Samford University in Birmingham.

References 

1951 births
American women writers
American women lawyers
Alabama lawyers
University of North Carolina alumni
Cumberland School of Law alumni
Florida Republicans
Living people
People from Nashville, Tennessee
American bloggers
American women bloggers
21st-century American women